My Boys is an American television sitcom that debuted on November 28, 2006, on TBS. The show revolves around Penelope Jane "P.J." Franklin (Jordana Spiro), a female sports columnist in Chicago, and the men in her life including her brother, her ex-boyfriend, her best friend, and a sportswriter for a rival publication.

The first season was split into two parts, with 13 episodes being shown in late 2006 and 9 episodes in the summer of 2007. Season two was shown in the middle of 2008 while the third season was shown in early 2009. The fourth season premiered on July 25, 2010. On September 14, 2010 it was announced that TBS decided to not renew My Boys for a fifth season. A total of 49 episodes were broadcast over 4 seasons.



Series overview

Episodes

Season 1 (2006–07)

Season 2 (2008)

Season 3 (2009)

Season 4 (2010)

References

External links

 

Lists of American sitcom episodes